Parrearra is a suburb in the Sunshine Coast Region, Queensland, Australia.

Parrearra is located within the Kawana Waters urban area and is informally referred to as Kawana Island.

Geography
The suburb is bounded to the west by the Mooloolah River, to the north by Nicklin Way, to the north-east by the Parrearra Canal, to the south-east and south by the Wyuna Canal, making the suburb an island. The canals combined are unofficially known as Parrearra Lake. The primary purpose of the canals together with the associated locks and weirs is for flood mitigation in the Kawana Waters area, while recreational use of the waterways is a secondary purpose.

Access to the island suburb is principally via Kawana Way which enters the suburb from the east (Mountain Creek / Sippy Downs) crossing the Mooloola River and exits the suburb to the south via a bridge over the Wyuna Canal (Warana). Kawana Island Boulevard connects Kawana Way and exits the suburb to the east crossing a bridge over Wyuna Canal to Warana.

Nicklin Way travels the northern boundary of Parrearra from Mooloolaba to Minyama but there is no access from the Nicklin Way into Parearra.

The suburb is residential in character.

History 
The name of the suburb was one of several proposed in 1967 by the Kawana Waters developer, Alfred Grant, drawing on an unattributed reference by Justine Kenyon in her book on Aboriginal words, denoting a length of river. Parrearra was named as a town by the Queensland Place Names Board on 1 September 1967, but was redesignated and bounded as a suburb on 1989.

Education 
There are no schools in Parrearra. The nearest primary schools are Brighwater State School in Mountain Creek and Buddina State School in Buddina. The nearest secondary school is Kawana Waters State College in Bokarina.

References

External links
 

Suburbs of the Sunshine Coast Region
Kawana Waters, Queensland